Patrick De Koning (born 23 April 1961) is a Belgian archer. He competed at the 1984 Summer Olympics and the 1988 Summer Olympics.

References

External links
 

1961 births
Living people
Belgian male archers
Olympic archers of Belgium
Archers at the 1984 Summer Olympics
Archers at the 1988 Summer Olympics
People from Dendermonde
Sportspeople from East Flanders